Stephen Parrish (1846 – 1938) was an American painter and etcher who became one of the 19th century's most celebrated printmakers during the "American Etching Revival." Privately trained by painter and animal etcher Peter Moran, Parrish was best known for his landscape etching of "Eastern North America, particularly the harbors and villages of New England and Canada," and as the father of painter and illustrator Maxfield Parrish.

Career

Parrish was engaged in mercantile pursuits until he was 30, when he applied himself to art, studying for a year with a local teacher.

In 1878, he attended the Pennsylvania Academy in Philadelphia, and in 1879 at the National Academy in New York City. He soon turned his attention also to etching, and in December 1879, produced his first plate. After that he applied himself to both branches of art, exhibiting in New York City, Boston, Philadelphia, London, Liverpool, Paris, Munich, Dresden, and Vienna.

Memberships 

 New York Etching Club 
 Society of Painter-Etchers of London

Personal life 
Born to a Philadelphia Quaker family, Parrish married in 1869, and his only child, artist Frederick Maxfield Parrish was born in 1870.

Etchings 
Parrish's etchings include: Northern Moorland and Low Tide — Bay of Fundy (1882); Coast of New Brunswick, Winter Evening — Windsor, Nova Scotia, and Bethlehem (1884); London Bridge and On the Thames (1886); and A Gloucestar Wharf (1887). Among his paintings are November (1880); In Winter Quarters (1884); Low Tide — Evening (1885); On the Rance, Brittany (1886); and The Road to Perry's Peak. He also frequently made etchings out of earlier sketches and drawings.

References

 
 Stephen Parrish: Rediscovered American Etcher at Woodmere Art Museum (visited 7 June 2010)

External links

Catalogue of pictures, a digitized exhibition catalog containing a list of works by the artist.

1846 births
1938 deaths
18th-century American painters
18th-century American male artists
American male painters
19th-century American painters
19th-century American male artists
American etchers
20th-century American painters
20th-century American printmakers
20th-century American male artists